Morgan Jenness is an American freelance dramaturg based in New York City.

Biography
For over ten years, Jenness worked at The Public Theater, under both George C. Wolfe and Joseph Papp in roles ranging from literary manager to Director of Play Development to Associate Producer of the New York Shakespeare Festival. They were also Associate Artistic Director at the New York Theatre Workshop, and an Associate Director at the Los Angeles Theater Center in charge of new projects. They have worked with the Young Playwrights Festival, the Mark Taper Forum, the Playwrights Center/Playlabs, the Bay Area Playwrights Festival, Double Image/New York Stage and Film, CSC, Victory Gardens, Hartford Stage, and Center Stage as a dramaturg, workshop director, and/or artistic consultant. They have participated as a visiting artist and adjunct in playwriting programs at the University of Iowa, Brown University, Bread Loaf, Columbia and NYU and are currently on the faculty at Fordham University at Lincoln Center and Pace University, where they teach theater history.

Jenness has served on peer panels for various funding institutions, including NYSCA and the National Endowment for the Arts, with whom they served as a site evaluator for almost a decade. In 1998 Ms. Jenness joined Helen Merrill Ltd., an agency representing writers, directors, composers and designers, as Creative Director. They now work at Abrams Artist Agency as an agent representing writers for stage and screen, directors, composers and lyricists. In 2003, Ms. Jenness was presented with an Obie Award Special Citation for Longtime Support of Playwrights. At its 30th Anniversary Conference in New York City, the Literary Managers and Dramaturgs of the Americas presented the G. E. Lessing Award for Career Achievement to Morgan Jenness. The Lessing Award is LMDA's most prestigious award, given for lifetime achievement in the field of dramaturgy. As of 2015, Jenness is only the sixth recipient of the award in LMDA's 30-year history.

Jenness was a recipient of a prestigious 2015 Doris Duke Impact Award and is currently working as an activist and artistic consultant via In This Distracted Globe.

References

Living people
20th-century American dramatists and playwrights
Writers from New York City
Year of birth missing (living people)
Fordham University faculty
American women dramatists and playwrights
20th-century American women writers
American women academics
21st-century American women